Carrollton is a home rule-class city in—and the county seat of—Carroll County, Kentucky, United States, at the confluence of the Ohio and Kentucky rivers. The population was 3,938 at the 2010 census.

Geography
Carrollton is located in northern Carroll County at  (38.677329, -85.171504). The city is situated on the Ohio River at the mouth of the Kentucky River. It is bordered by the city of Prestonville to the west across the Kentucky River. To the north, across the Ohio River, is Switzerland County, Indiana.

U.S. Route 42 passes through the center of the community, leading northeast  to Cincinnati, Ohio, and southwest  to Louisville.

History
Carrollton was laid out in 1792, and it was known as Port William initially. It served as the county seat of Gallatin County until 1838 when the county was split, creating Carroll County. Port William was renamed Carrollton after Declaration of Independence signer Charles Carroll and became the seat of the new county. The town's first newspaper, the Carrollton Eagle, was published in 1848. On September 3, 1863, during the Civil War, Confederates robbed the Southern Bank of Kentucky and were followed by the Union Army. Confederates also stole the sword of prominent resident William Orlando Butler, and he later caught up with the troops and retrieved it. The Louisville & Nashville Railroad was built near town in 1868 and eventually became more important to the town's economy than river traffic. It did cause a spike in agricultural production, especially tobacco.

It has one of the state's largest tobacco markets, and the population has remained steady since being recorded at 3,884 in the 1970 census. In 1988, the Carrollton bus disaster garnered national attention for what was one of the worst bus collisions in United States history.

Demographics

As of the census of 2000, there were 3,846 people, 1,598 households, and 987 families residing in the city. The racial makeup of the city was 78.99% White, 2.24% Black, 0.13% Native American, 0.18% Asian, 2.03% from other races, and 1.43% from two or more races. Hispanic or Latino of any race were 19.42% of the population.

There were 1,598 households, out of which 27.7% had children under the age of 18 living with them, 43.0% were married couples living together, 14.7% had a female householder with no husband present, and 38.2% were non-families. 33.9% of all households were made up of individuals, and 16.2% had someone living alone who was 65 years of age or older. The average household size was 2.29 and the average family size was 2.90.

In the city, the population was spread out, with 23.0% under the age of 18, 9.9% from 18 to 24, 27.3% from 25 to 44, 22.1% from 45 to 64, and 17.7% who were 65 years of age or older. The median age was 38 years. For every 100 females, there were 95.4 males. For every 100 females age 18 and over, there were 90.2 males.

The median income for a household in the city was $29,818, and the median income for a family was $41,193. Males had a median income of $32,563 versus $20,000 for females. The per capita income for the city was $14,376. About 13.9% of families and 20.2% of the population were below the poverty line, including 31.5% of those under age 18 and 26.2% of those age 65 or over.

Climate
The climate in this area is characterized by hot, humid summers and generally mild to cool winters.  According to the Köppen Climate Classification system, Carrollton has a humid subtropical climate, abbreviated "Cfa" on climate maps.

Education
Carrollton has a lending library, the Carroll County Public Library.

In literature
The town of Hargrave, Kentucky in the fiction of Wendell Berry is a fictionalized version of Carrollton. Berry uses Carrollton's original name, Port William, as the name for the town in which most of his stories take place.  Berry portrays Hargrave as significantly larger and more urban than Port William (a fictionalized Port Royal, Kentucky). It is the center of local nightlife and professional services. Unlike the largely egalitarian rural society of Port William, there is an "upper crust" of professionals and landowners in Hargrave.

References

External links
 City of Carrollton official website
 Carrollton, Kentucky at UrbanUp
 Things to do in Carrollton, Kentucky

Cities in Carroll County, Kentucky
Cities in Kentucky
Kentucky populated places on the Ohio River
County seats in Kentucky